Erin Gee (born 1983) is a Canadian artist based in Montreal, Quebec. She is known for new media artworks and electroacoustic music composition and her art is inspired by technology and emotions, for example creating music and moving machinery inspired by recordings of heart rate and anxiety. Her works have been shown and performed internationally. Gee taught Communications as an assistant professor at Concordia University In 2018 she was an invited research associate at the University of Maine, USA in the department of chemical and biomedical engineering at University of Maine. In 2019 she began doctoral studies in music (composition and sound creation) at Université de Montréal under the direction of Dr Nicolas Bernier.

Career 
Gee's art includes works for performance, interactive installation, multichannel audio, robotics, video, print media, and interactive sculpture.

Swarming Emotional Pianos 
As part of her work, Gee has become a self-taught robotics specialist, measuring "actors’ sweat production, heart rate, blood flow and breathing — all indicators of heightened emotions — to create the data for a computer program that transfers the data into musical notes and triggers a performance from her tubular bell-outfitted robots." This informs her work titled Swarming Emotional Pianos, which includes a video of two actors responding to vocal commands of fear, anger, joy. This work was created in collaboration with Vaughan Macefield, an Australian neurophysiologist and presented on December 13, 2014 as part of the Innovations en Concert series in Montreal, QC. The work titled Orpheux Larynx was created in collaboration with Stelarc as a vocal performance for three choral robots and human soprano singer.

Project H.E.A.R.T. (2017) 
Gee also made a foray into video-game-as-art with Project H.E.A.R.T. ("Holographic Empathy Attack Robots Team"), a collaboration with Alex M. Lee. The game is presented as an installation of a desktop computer with an oculus headset and a biosensor connected to the user's hand would measure changes in their skin conductance and heart rate as they played the video game. The game hedges on challenging the user to use their focus and empathy to motivate in-game soldiers as opposed to the typical kill-to-win dynamic of first-person shooter video games.

to the sooe (2018) 
Gee collaborated with Sofian Audry to create a 3D printed sound object with a human voice murmuring the words of a neural network that's trained by Emily Brontë, a deceased author. The work was further inspired by ASMR and its effects on the body. The work debuted with hexagram collective from Montreal, at Ars Electronica in 2018.

Education
Gee graduated from the University of Regina with a Bachelor of Music Education degree in 2006 and a Bachelor of Fine Arts in 2009. She graduated from Concordia University in 2014 with a Master of Fine Arts degree.

Exhibitions and Performances

References

External links 
 Bondar, Carin. December 14, 2014. “Erin Gee Blends Emotions, Science, Music and Robotic Pianos”. Scientific American Blogs.  
 Cassivi, Marc. 23, Octobre 2012. “La symphonie des sens.” La Presse.  
 Cinq a Six. September 12, 2012. “Compose Your Emotions.” CBC.  
 Godwin, Alexandra. (Dec 17, 2014) "Artist Makes Femme Bots That Respond To Your Feels." Oyster.com. Retrieved March 14, 2016. 
 Ishmael, Amelia. “On Site: Sound Art Theories Symposium School of the Art Institute of Chicago, Chicago, USA.” The WIRE: Adventures in Sound and Music, no.  336, February 2012. 
  Artist's website. Retrieved March 14, 2016. 
 "Futurfemmes" Retrieved March 14, 2016.
 Gee, Erin. Swarming Emotional Pianos (mechanical artwork). Youtube. Retrieved March 14, 2016.
 Kelly, Jeanette. Dec 12, 2014. "Erin Gee is making music from human emotions: Robots use biological feedback to produce music in Swarming Emotional Pianos." CBC News. Retrieved March 14, 2016.
 Nitesh. May 16, 2014. "BRIDGING ROBOTICS AND EMOTION: A CONVERSATION WITH ERIN GEE." Atwood Magazine. Retrieved March 14, 2016.
 Shingler, Benjamin. October 8, 2012. “This is Your Brain on Music: Researchers to create tunes written by body’s emotional responses.” National Post. 
 SSHRC Research Stories. February 23, 2016 “Feeling the Music.” Social Sciences and Humanities Research Council. Retrieved March 14, 2016.

Artists from Montreal
Canadian multimedia artists
Concordia University alumni
University of Regina alumni
Academic staff of Concordia University
Canadian women artists
New media artists
Living people

1983 births